Calon FM is a community radio station serving Wrexham and surrounding areas.

The station is owned and operated by Wrexham Community Broadcasting and broadcasts from studios at the Wrexham Enterprise Hub in the city centre with its transmitter atop Tŷ Pawb.

Calon FM was first launched as a RSL radio station, originally covering events at the 2005 Wrexham Science Festival on 87.7FM. In 2006, the station was granted a 5-year community radio licence. The station officially launched on Saturday 1 March 2008 on 105FM in Wrexham after a short period of test transmissions.

Calon FM was based on the campus of Glyndŵr University on Mold Road, initially based above a recording studio before moving into the Centre for Creative Industries (CCI). Currently, they are based out of the Wrexham Enterprise Hub.

Calon FM's output consists of music, features, sport, talk and specialist programming produced and presented by volunteers. The station also aired weekly programming in Welsh and other languages.

Asides its primary transmission area, the station can also be heard through much of the central areas of Wrexham County Borough, and parts of southern Flintshire.

In August 2017, Calon FM began carrying live commentaries on Wrexham A.F.C. matches throughout the football season The station's live coverage ended after two seasons.

In its original incarnation, Calon FM also won a number of industry awards, including the Wales category in the Radio Academy Nations and Regions Awards twice in a row, in 2013 and 2014.

Temporary closure and revival
On 31 December 2020, it was reported Calon FM would close, following a decision by Glyndŵr University to withdraw its support. The university provided funding and studio facilities to the station since its launch.

In a statement, directors said the long-term financial position of the station's owners, Calon Communications Ltd, was left untenable as a result of the withdrawal, despite being able to raise additional income through advertising and sponsorship.

A Glyndwr University spokesperson said it had spent more than £1 million on staff, equipment and indirect costs for studios and professional services.

In a later statement, the station's volunteers criticised the board of directors for the decision and announced they were forming a rescue plan to retain the FM licence and resume broadcasting.

Calon FM ceased broadcasting at midday on Wednesday 20 January 2021.

Following a tender process involving three separate groups, the station's assets were handed over to its volunteer staff, who intend to relaunch the Calon service under the ownership of a new community interest company, 'Wrexham Community Broadcasting'. The group launched a campaign to secure funds to resume broadcasting.

On 8 October 2021, Calon FM announced it had resumed broadcasting after the original licence was transferred by OFCOM to the station's new owners. Test transmissions, including some presenter-led programming, were broadcast ahead of a soft launch of the station on Monday 11 October 2021.

Wrexham Community Broadcasting is also part of Wrexham DAB Ltd, a consortium which applied for a small-scale DAB multiplex in its broadcast area. 

It was the only applicant in North Wales when bidding closed, and in May 2022, OFCOM announced the consortium had been awarded a SS-DAB licence.

References

External links
Official website
The Wall Recording Studio

Wrexham
Community radio stations in the United Kingdom
Radio stations in Wales